The Carmen McRae-Betty Carter Duets is a 1987 live album of duets by the American jazz singers Betty Carter and Carmen McRae. Originally released on American Music Hall Records, it was reissued in 1996 by Verve under the title Duets: Live at the Great American Music Hall with three previously unreleased tracks by McRae alone.

Track listing
"What's New?" (Johnny Burke, Bob Haggart) – 4:20
"Stolen Moments" (Oliver Nelson) – 3:36
"But Beautiful" (Burke, Jimmy Van Heusen) – 5:55
"Am I Blue?" (Harry Akst, Grant Clarke) – 6:45
"Glad to Be Unhappy"/"Where or When" (Richard Rodgers, Lorenz Hart)/(Rodgers, Hart) – 5:33
"Sometimes I'm Happy" (Irving Caesar, Clifford Grey, Vincent Youmans) – 7:54
"Isn't It Romantic?" (Rodgers, Hart) – 2:57
"Sophisticated Lady" (Duke Ellington, Irving Mills, Mitchell Parish) – 3:34
"It Don't Mean a Thing (If It Ain't Got That Swing)" (Ellington, Mills) – 6:10
"I Hear Music" (Burton Lane, Frank Loesser) – 2:52
"Love Dance" (Ivan Lins, Vitor Martins, Paul Williams) – 8:09
"Old Devil Moon" (Yip Harburg, Lane) – 3:48

Tracks 10-12 not included on original LP release.

Personnel
Betty Carter -  vocals
Carmen McRae - vocals, piano
Eric Gunnison - piano
Jim Hughart - double bass
Winard Harper - drums

References

Betty Carter live albums
Carmen McRae live albums
Vocal duet albums
1987 live albums
Verve Records live albums
Albums recorded at the Great American Music Hall